The following lists events that happened during 2005 in North Korea.

Incumbents
Premier: Pak Pong-ju 
Supreme Leader: Kim Jong-il

Events

February
 February 22 - North Korea hints that it may be willing to return to nuclear negotiations under unspecified conditions.

April
 April 22 - Rumors abound that a nuclear test by North Korea may be imminent, and that the United States is urging the People's Republic of China to pressure North Korea not to do so.

May
 May 16 - The United Nations World Food Program states that North Korea is in dire need of food aid.

July
 July 25 - Bilateral negotiations have resumed between the US and North Korea.

September
 September 20 - North Korea announces that its offer to end its nuclear arms program is dependent on it being allowed to build a civilian nuclear reactor.

References

Further reading
 

 
North Korea
Years of the 21st century in North Korea
2000s in North Korea
North Korea